Margaret Ng Ngoi-yee (born 25 January 1948) is a politician, barrister, writer and columnist in Hong Kong. She was a member of the Legislative Council of Hong Kong from 1995 to 2012.

Biography
Before entering the legal profession, Margaret Ng worked at the University of Hong Kong and Chase Manhattan Bank (now JP Morgan Chase). She also held senior positions in journalism, serving as publisher and deputy editor-in-chief of the Ming Pao newspaper; and as a columnist for South China Morning Post.

Besides being a lawyer and journalist, Ng is also an accomplished expert in the fields of philosophy and literature.  She has written several volumes of critical studies on the wuxia novels of Jin Yong and earned her Doctor of Philosophy degree from Boston University.

She appeared in a BBC documentary, The Last Governor, which followed Chris Patten and the last years of British rule in Hong Kong.

Like many politicians from the Pan-democrat camp, Ng is denied entry into the Mainland. On 12 September 1999, she was barred travel there to attend a conference on China's constitution.

She was a former director at Stand News and a former Civic Party lawmaker at Legislative Council of Hong Kong.

Arrests
On 18 April 2020, Ng was arrested as one of 15 Hong Kong high-profile democracy figures, on suspicion of organizing, publicizing or taking part in several unauthorized assemblies between August and October 2019 in the course of the anti-extradition bill protests. Following protocol, the police statement did not disclose the names of the accused. On 16 April 2021, she was sentenced to 12 months' imprisonment suspended for 24 months.

On 29 December 2021, Ng and six other people linked to Stand News were arrested on suspicion of breaching a colonial-era law covering conspiracy to print or distribute seditious materials that were supposedly published at the pro-democracy outlet. She was released on bail next day together with the five of the detained.

Academic history
 B.A., University of Hong Kong (HKU) 
 M.A., University of Hong Kong (HKU) 
 PhD, Boston University (1976) (Three theories of despair: the Confucian, the Catholic and the Freudian)
 B.A. (Law), University of Cambridge
 Postgraduate Certificate in Laws, University of Hong Kong (HKU)

See also
List of graduates of University of Hong Kong

References 

1948 births
Alumni of the University of Hong Kong
Barristers of Hong Kong
Boston University alumni
Hong Kong journalists
Living people
Alumni of the University of Cambridge
Charter 08 signatories
Civic Party politicians
HK LegCo Members 1995–1997
HK LegCo Members 1998–2000
HK LegCo Members 2000–2004
HK LegCo Members 2004–2008
HK LegCo Members 2008–2012
Hong Kong women lawyers
British expatriates in Hong Kong
20th-century Hong Kong women politicians
21st-century Hong Kong women politicians